Epiphthora microtima is a moth of the family Gelechiidae. It was described by Edward Meyrick in 1904. It is found in Australia, where it has been recorded from Queensland.

The forewings are light greyish ochreous, irrorated (sprinkled) with fuscous and obscurely sprinkled with whitish. The hindwings are dark fuscous.

References

Moths described in 1904
Epiphthora
Taxa named by Edward Meyrick